Aisha Ghaus Pasha (born 3 March 1962) is a Pakistani politician and economist. In April 2022, she was appointed as a State Minister in the newly formed 34-member Cabinet. She is one of the five female members of the new Pakistan Federal Cabinet. She has been a member of the National Assembly of Pakistan since August 2018. Previously she was a Member of the Provincial Assembly of the Punjab, from June 2013 to May 2018.

Early life and education
Pasha was born on 3 March 1962 in Lahore. She earned the degrees of Bachelor of Arts (Hons), Master of Arts in Economics and a Masters of Applied Science in Economics from the University of Karachi. Pasha is married to Hafeez Pasha, an economist and former advisor to the Federal Government.

Political career

She was elected to the Provincial Assembly of the Punjab as a candidate of Pakistan Muslim League (N) (PML-N) on a reserved seat for women in June 2013. In May 2015, she was inducted into the provincial cabinet of the Chief Minister Shehbaz Sharif and was made Provincial Minister of Punjab for Finance.

She was elected to the National Assembly of Pakistan as a candidate of PML-N on a reserved seat for women from Punjab in 2018 Pakistani general election.

References

Living people
1962 births
Pakistani economists
Punjab MPAs 2013–2018
Pakistani MNAs 2018–2023
Pakistan Muslim League (N) MPAs (Punjab)
Pakistan Muslim League (N) MNAs
University of Karachi alumni
Alumni of the University of Leeds
Women members of the Provincial Assembly of the Punjab
Women provincial ministers of Punjab
Female finance ministers
Pakistani women economists
Finance Ministers of Punjab, Pakistan
21st-century Pakistani women politicians